{{Taxobox
| image = Aphidecta obliterata02.jpg
| image_width = 250px
| image_caption =Aphidecta obliterata. Dorsal view
| regnum = Animalia
| phylum = Arthropoda
| classis = Insecta
| ordo = Coleoptera
| familia = Coccinellidae
| subfamilia = Coccinellinae
| genus = Aphidecta
| species = A. obliterata
| binomial = Aphidecta obliterata
| binomial_authority = (Linnaeus, 1758)   
|synonyms_ref=
 Coccinella obliterata Linnaeus, 1758 
 Coccinella formosa Gravenhorst, 1807 
 Coccinella livida DeGeer, 1775 
 Coccinella m-nigrum Fabricius, 1792 
 Coccinella obsoleta Schneider, D. H., 1792 
 Coccinella pallida Thunberg, 1784 
 Coccinella sexnotata Thunberg, 1784
}}Aphidecta obliterata (common name larch ladybird, or larch ladybug) is a species of Coccinellidae, a flying beetle.

Varietas
Varietas include:
 Aphidecta obliterata var. fenestrata Weise 
 Aphidecta obliterata var. illigeri Weise 
 Aphidecta obliterata var. livida Dejean 
 Aphidecta obliterata var. pallida Thunberg 
 Aphidecta obliterata var. sexnotata Thunberg

Distribution
This species is present in Europe, European Russia, the Caucasus, Belarus, Ukraine, Transcaucasia,  Asia Minor, North America, Newfoundland, Virginia and South Carolina.Fauna europaea

These tiny beetles have an elongate oval body, with strongly convex elytra, smooth, shiny and densely, finely punctured. Head shows a black arch-shaped marking. Antennae are club-shaped, with 9-11 segments.

The larch ladybirds are beetles with a great variability in color and markings, with several varietas. For example Aphidecta obliterata v. fenestrata has entirely black elytra, while usually they range from tan to brown, often with a pink tinge. They have a dark suture and usually a dark oblique line posteriorly. The pronotum is beige, with four dark brown lines forming a M mark. While other species of ladybugs have prominent spots, this insect has smaller, less distinct spots, or small blotches, if any.

HabitatAphidecta obliterata inhabits high bogs an peat areas, mainly coniferous and mixed forests (for instance Central European mixed forests, Sarmatic mixed forests) and, especially, in Pinus sylvestris and other temperate needleleaf forests. It is found occasionally in gardens and parks.  It is mainly found on Pinus sylvestris and other Pinus species and Picea abies and on Larix decidua occasionally under flakes of bark, under bark, or in moss on the trunks.

Biology
These beetles have a restricted range of adaptability to changes in ecological conditions. They are aphidophagous, mainly feeding on  Lachnidae, Adelgidae and other aphids of pines. The adults can be found in spring and summer. They overwinter in bark crevices and in litter. It has been released in the US and Canada for biocontrol of Adelges piceae''.

Variability of Aphidecta obliterata

References

External links
 Photos at Golddistel.de

Coccinellidae
Beetles described in 1758
Taxa named by Carl Linnaeus